Yali Dream Creations LLC, known as YDC, is an Indian comic books publisher, focused on creating original stories using comics and graphic novels. YDC was founded in 2012 by Asvin Srivatsangam, and published its first graphic novel in 2013, written by Shamik Dasgupta.

The name 'YALI' (யாளி) was inspired from Hindu Mythology. Yali ([jaːɭi]; also known as Vyala or Vidala in Sanskrit) is a mythical creature seen in many Hindu temples, often sculpted onto the pillars.

References

External links
The Village Is India's First Comic Live Action Adaptation From Amazon - Bleedingcool
Amazon Prime Launches Video-On-Demand In India, Announces 40 Titles
Vigilante Justice is Yali Dream Creations next: an Exclusive Interview with  Founder 
Shamik Dasgupta : I cannot do anything else but comics 
Asvin Srivatsangam’s Graphic Novel ‘Rakshak’ Gets a silver screen adaptation 
 Yali Dream Creations’ Rakshak became the first superhero comic book series which will be adapted on silver screen. Helmed by noted filmmaker Sanjay Gupta
 Sanjay Gupta to adapt superhero graphic novel Rakshak
 Director Sanjay Gupta acquires the rights Rakshak Origin Series
 "Comic to cinema: Desi vampires set to curdle blood of horror fans". 
 'The Caravan' goes Bollywood
 Asvin Srivatsangam's Yali Dream Creations launches 'The Caravan'
 "It's a bird, it's a plane - It's an Indian woman". Telegraph India.
 Asvin Srivatsangam's interview on 'Devi Chaudhurani' and its graphic novel adaptation
 "IThe story Devi Rising". 
 Mumbai Film & Comics Convention: A viewpoint on what needs to change
 Yali Dream Creations official website

Comic book publishing companies of India
Companies established in 2012
Comic book publishing companies of the United States